Cairanne AOC is a wine-growing AOC in the southern Rhône wine region of France, in the commune of Cairanne in the Vaucluse département. Red, rosé and white wines are produced. Previously a part of Côtes-du-Rhône Villages AOC, the wines received their own AOC provisionally on 20 June 2016, and definitely on 25 June 2018.

History 
Cairanne was one five communes in the Côtes-du-Rhône appellation that stood out sufficiently to be included in the initial considerations for creating a Côtes-du-Rhône-Villages appellation. The name Côtes-du-Rhône Cairanne was used from 1953, and the designation Côtes-du-Rhône-Villages Cairanne followed in 1967, when the "Villages" AOC was finally created.

References

External links 

Rhône wine AOCs
Geography of Vaucluse